Grover Cleveland High School was a high school located in Buffalo, New York. It is named for former U.S. president and Buffalo mayor Grover Cleveland and generally housed students from Grades 9 - 12, teaching according to the Board of Regents. Currently, the school building houses The International Preparatory School.

History 
Grover Cleveland High School was originally constructed in 1913 as the home to Buffalo State College, then known as Buffalo Teacher's School. In 1931, Grover Cleveland High School was formed as a school serving the Lower West Side of Buffalo. The building was renovated in 1959, where an addition was built onto the northern end of the school that contained classrooms, a swimming pool, and a new gymnasium. During the 1970s, Grover was designated as the school to serve foreign language-speaking students within the City of Buffalo. In 2007, the building began housing two schools, Grover Cleveland High School, and the International Preparatory School, a math and science magnet affiliated with the College Board. In 2010, Grover Cleveland High School was closed to new due to low graduation rates and increasing incidents of student violence and possession of weapons. The final class of seniors graduated in 2011.

From 2011 until June 2013, the building was renovated and re-opened to students at International Preparatory School and the new STAR Academy in Fall 2013.

Former principals 
Previous assignment and reasons for departure listed in parentheses
Mr. Charles A. Kennedy–1931-1951 (Vice Principal - East High School, retired)
Mr. John F. Devine–1951-1962 (Vice Principal - Grover Cleveland High School, died)
Mr. Martin B. O'Donnell–1962-1967, 1968-1970 (Assistant Principal - Lafayette High School, named Principal of Hutchinson Central Technical High School)
Dr. John A. Demerly [interim]–1967-1968 (Assistant Principal - Grover Cleveland High School, returned to position)
Mr. Daniel M. Kublitz [interim]–1970-1971 (Assistant Principal - Grover Cleveland High School, named Assistant Principal of Bennett High School)
Mr. Ronald J. Meer–1971-1975 (Vice Principal - Woodlawn Junior High School, named Principal of Bennett High School)
Mr. John E. Ward–1975-1979 (Principal - Genesee-Humboldt Junior High School, retired)
Mr. Rocco A. Lamparelli–1979-1985 (Supervising Principal - South Buffalo Public Schools, named Acting Assistant Superintendent of Secondary Education for Buffalo Public Schools)
Mr. John H. Davis–1985-1989 (Assistant Principal - Bennett High School, retired)
Mr. Benjamin L. Randle, Jr.–1989-2004 (Principal - Buffalo Alternative High School, retired)
Mr. Kevin J. Eberle–2004-2007 (Principal - West Seneca West Senior High School, named Principal of the International Preparatory School at Grover)
Dr. Casey M. Young Welch–2007-2010 (Acting Principal - Harriet Ross Tubman School, named Principal of Academy School 131 @ 44)

Selected former assistant principals 
Previous assignment and reasons for departure listed in parentheses
Mr. Thomas J. McDonnell–1931-1937 (Social Studies teacher - South Park High School, named Principal of Kensington High School)
Mr. Randolph Lindeman–1937-1939 (unknown, named Assistant Principal of Hutchinson Central Technical High School)
Mr. John Devine–1939-1951 (Principal - South Park Annex, named Principal of Grover Cleveland High School)
Mr. Charles J. Monan–1951-1954 (Teacher - South Park High School, died)
Dr. Louis T. Gitlin–1954-1958 (Assistant Principal - East High School, named Assistant Superintendent for Pupil Personnel Services of Buffalo Public Schools)
Mr. Earl G. Beech–1958-1961 (Assistant Principal - School 44, died)
Mr. Angelo J. Gianturco–1961-1966 (Science teacher - Grover Cleveland High School, named Principal of Kensington High School)
Dr. John A. Demerly–1966-1967 (Assistant Principal - South Park High School, named Acting Principal of Grover Cleveland High School)
Mr. Daniel M. Kublitz–1966-1970 (English teacher - Bennett High School, named Interim Principal of Grover Cleveland High School)
Mrs. Doris H. Erickson-Gleason–1967-1968 (Science teacher - Riverside High School, named Assistant Principal of Southside Junior High School) 
Dr. John Demerly–1968-1969 (Interim Principal - Grover Cleveland High School, retired)
Mr. Epifanio J. Saia–1969-1979 (Italian teacher - Grover Cleveland High School, died)
Mr. Daniel J. Manley [interim]–1970-1971 (Social Studies teacher - Grover Cleveland High School, returned to teaching)
Mr. J. Nelson Scott–1971-1972 (Assistant Principal - East High School, named Principal of Roosevelt Elementary School)
Mr. Daniel Manley–1972-1985 (Social Studies teacher - Grover Cleveland High School, named Assistant Principal of McKinley Vocational High School)
Mr. Stanley J. Wegrzynowski
Mr. Charles L. Sodaro–1979-1988 (Assistant Principal - Riverside High School, named Assistant Principal of Emerson Vocational High School) 
Mr. David E. Baez–1985-1993 (Spanish teacher - Grover Cleveland High School, named Principal of Herman Badillo Bilingual Academy)
Mr. Daniel Manley–1988-? (Assistant Principal - McKinley Vocational High School, unknown)
Mr. Raymond D. Perreault–1989-1993 (English teacher - Grover Cleveland High School, named Principal of Buffalo Alternative High School)
Ms. Sharon A. Lanza–1990-1994 (Math teacher - Grover Cleveland High School, named Assistant Principal of Lafayette High School)
Mr. Jon G. Lyon–1993-1997 (Assistant Principal - Kensington High School, named Principal of Emerson Vocational High School)
Dr. Eileen H. Czarnecki–1999-2001 (Math teacher - Buffalo Public Schools, named Principal of Kensington High School)
Dr. Josephine Mayfield (Spanish teacher - Buffalo Public Schools, named Director of Foreign Languages of Buffalo Public Schools)
Ms. Robin L. Hahn–2000-2001 (SURR Coordinator - Grover Cleveland High School, named Assistant Principal of Leonardo da Vinci High School)
Mr. Albert T. Ventresca–2001-2004 (Business teacher - Grover Cleveland High School, retired)
Ms. Kathleen A. Vitagliano–?-2003 (English teacher - Kensington Prep, named Principal of 171 Middle School)
Mr. Carlos J. Villarroel–2002-2003 (Assistant Principal - Kensington High School, named Assistant Principal of Burgard Vocational High School)
Ms. Mary A. Craig–2003-2004 (Assistant Principal - Burgard Vocational High School, retired)
Mrs. Naomi R. Cerre–2004-2005 (Assistant Principal - McKinley Vocational High School, named Assistant Principal of East High School)
Dr. Jose G. Rivera–2004-2008 (Assistant Principal - West Hertel Academy, retired)
Dr. Eileen Czarnecki–2004-2005 (Principal - South Park High School, named Assistant Principal of Buffalo Academy for Visual and Performing Arts)
Ms. Wendy L. Richards–2005-2007 (Assistant Principal - Buffalo Academy for Visual and Performing Arts, named Principal of North Tonawanda Middle School)
Mr. Rafael A. Mercado–2007-2010 (Assistant Principal - Dr. Antonia Pantoja Community School of Excellence, named Assistant Principal of Academy School 131 @ 44)
Ms. Denise McMichael-Houston–2008-2009 (Assistant Principal - Buffalo Elementary School of Technology, named Assistant Principal of Dr. Charles R. Drew Science Magnet)

Selected former administrators 

*Denotes interim appointment

Notable alumni 

Joel Giambra - Former Erie County, New York executive
Altemio Sanchez - The Bike Path Rapist
Steven Means - Defensive end in the National Football League
 Robert SanGeorge - former United Nations official,  global campaigner for human rights  and the environment.

Notable faculty 

Michael Masecchia – former teacher, and a identified associate of the Buffalo crime family. On August 23, 2019 FBI and HSI agents searched Grover Cleveland High School teacher Michael Masecchia’s home where they found homemade explosives, stolen firearms, and narcotics as part of an ongoing investigation into organized crime and public corruption. A criminal complaint identified Masecchia as a drug dealer who has a 20-year history of growing and distributing large amounts of marijuana.  On September 22, 2020 a grand jury indictment identified Masecchia as “member or associate of ‘Italian Organized Crime’” and indicated he had been described by law enforcement as “an associate and possibly a made member of the Buffalo LCN family.” At the center of the indictment is the allegation that Masecchia bribed DEA Agent Joseph Bongiovanni to block investigations into himself and others believed to be tied into the local mafia. Masecchia “was the target of several DEA investigations between 2008 and 2019 and yet was never arrested or charged while Bongiovanni was an agent.” Michael married Bart T. Mazzara’s daughter, Krista.  Bart was alleged by prosecutors to be a made member of the Buffalo mob. His wife Krista's uncles are Dan and Victor Sansanese.

References 

Defunct schools in New York (state)
Education in Buffalo, New York
Educational institutions established in 1931
Educational institutions disestablished in 2011
High schools in Buffalo, New York
1931 establishments in New York (state)
2011 disestablishments in New York (state)